Aanand L. Rai (born 28 June 1971) is a Hindi film director and producer known for romantic-comedy movies Tanu Weds Manu (2011), Raanjhanaa (2013), Tanu Weds Manu: Returns (2015),  Zero (2018),  Atrangi Re  (2021) and Raksha Bandhan (2022).

Early life and background
Rai was born and brought up in Delhi. After his schooling in Delhi, he did his computer engineering from Aurangabad, Maharashtra.

His family's original surname was Raisinghani, and had shifted to Dehradun from Sindh, after partition of India in 1947.

Career
Rai started his career as an engineer, but soon left it and moved to Mumbai where he started assisting his elder brother television director Ravi Rai in television series. Later he started directing his own shows. 

Eventually he made his directorial debut with the psychological thriller Strangers, starring Jimmy Shergill, based on the 1951 Hitchcock film Strangers on a Train. This was followed by Thodi Life Thoda Magic (2008) starring Parmeet Sethi. He achieved success with the 2011 romantic hit film Tanu Weds Manu starring Madhavan and Kangana Ranaut. In 2013, he directed Raanjhanaa which featured actor Dhanush in his Bollywood debut, Sonam Kapoor and Abhay Deol. His 2015 movie Tanu Weds Manu: Returns received critical acclaim as well as box office success. His next film was Zero, a romantic drama starring Shah Rukh Khan, Anushka Sharma and Katrina Kaif. The story revolves around a dwarf man. The film, though, described as ambitious in nature, received mixed reviews from critics and audiences.

He produces films under his banner Colour Yellow Productions.

Filmography

References

External links

1971 births
Living people
Hindi-language film directors
Film directors from Delhi
Film producers from Delhi
21st-century Indian film directors